The Ruf BTR (Gruppe B Turbo RUF) is a sports car built by German automobile manufacturer Ruf Automobile. The BTR began production in 1983 and was based on the Porsche 911 (produced from 1978–1989) available in a narrow 911 or optional wide body configuration akin to the 930 Turbo (the drag difference causing more than  difference in top speed). The BTR was the first 
Ruf production sports car with a company specific VIN. 

Construction of each vehicle began at the bare chassis level. About 20–30 cars were built this way, probably even more were converted from customer cars. Though no clear records exist to signify the total number of cars produced.

Specifications 
It came standard with a five-speed manual transmission, though a six-speed transmission became available in 1988 upon request. Other changes included bigger brakes and a stiffer suspension system.

Changes done to converted customer cars included a Ruf 5-speed manual transmission, quad-pipe exhaust system, Recaro leather seats, Ruf instrument clusters and steering wheel, Simpson race harness, twin-plug conversion applied to the engine, engine capacity increased to 3.4-litres with modifications done to the turbocharger, a front spoiler with an oil cooler, optional Porsche 935 style wing mirrors and Ruf 5-spoke 17-inch alloy wheels. The BTR conversion was available either for the 930 Turbo or for a Carrera 3.2.

Performance
Test results with narrow 911 body (by Car & Driver):
 0–: 1.6 seconds 
 0–: 4.3 seconds 
 0–: 9.6 seconds 
 0–: 16.9 seconds 
 0–: 24.3 seconds 
  mile (402m): 12.5 seconds at  
 Top speed:  (tested by Auto, Motor und Sport)

Awards and recognition 
In 1984, a Ruf BTR won the "World's Fastest Cars" contest held by the American car magazine Road & Track with a  lead and also dominated the acceleration tests.

In Auto, Motor und Sport 22/1984 issue, a Ruf BTR set a new 0-100 km/h acceleration record for production cars tested by the magazine.

Later Models

BTR 3.8 
Introduced in 1993, the BTR 3.8 was based on the rear-wheel-drive 964 Carrera 2 and changes included an enlarged engine capacity of 3.8-litres, a turbocharger, a 6-speed automatic transmission with an electronic clutch, a completely reworked suspension and brakes, special 18-inch Ruf 5-spoke wheels and larger tyres measuring 235/40 ZR at the front and 265/35 ZR at the rear.

The car had a spartan, driver focused interior and featured lightweight racing bucket seats.

BTR2 

Introduced in 1993, the Ruf BTR2 was based on the Porsche 993. Using the 993 Carrera as a donor car, the BTR2 had a single turbocharger setup (with 11.6 psi of boost pressure), just like the original BTR. Changes done to the engine included an air-to-air intercooler, an auxiliary oil-cooler, Bosch Motronic engine management system and a lower compression ratio.

The car included a Ruf 6-speed manual transmission, limited slip differential (with 60% lockup), lowered suspension (30mm reduction), bigger brake discs and stiff anti-rollbars as standard equipment. Other changes included Ruf 5-spoke alloy wheels, racing bucket seats in the interior, different front and rear bumpers and a "whale-tail" rear wing.

Notes

References 

History of Ruf on Concept Carz

BTR
Cars powered by boxer engines
Cars introduced in 1983
First car made by manufacturer
Rear-engined vehicles
Cars discontinued in 1989